Valerie Maria Henriette Magis (born 29 March 1992) is a Dutch field hockey player who plays as a defender for Belgian club Dragons.

Career

Club
Valerie Magis played her club hockey for HC Oranje-Rood in the Dutch Hoofdklasse, the top national league until 2019. In 2019 she left the Netherlands to play for Dragons in Belgium.

National team
Magis made her international debut in 2011, in a test match against South Africa.

Following her debut, Magis was left out of the team in 2012, and returned in 2013 at the 2012–13 Hockey World League Semi-finals in Rotterdam, Netherlands.

Magis medalled at three tournaments, winning bronze at the 2013 EuroHockey Championships and 2014 Champions Trophy, and silver at the 2015 EuroHockey Championships.

Since 2017, Magis has been left out of the national squad after a calf injury prevented her from competing. She has not been called into the squad since.

International goals

References

External links
 

1992 births
Living people
Dutch female field hockey players
Sportspeople from Heeze-Leende
Female field hockey defenders
Oranje Zwart players
HC Oranje-Rood players
KHC Dragons players
20th-century Dutch women
21st-century Dutch women